Rastko Petrović (1898-1949) was a Serbian poet and writer.

After serving in the Serbian Army in World War I, he studied law in Paris and became a diplomat. Based at the Yugoslav embassy in Washington, D.C. during World War II, he remained in the United States after the war and died there in 1949. In 1986, after official recognition, his remains were brought to Belgrade.

Works

 Burleska gospodina Peruna, boga groma (A burlesque of Lord Perun, god of thunder), 1921.
 Otkrovenje (Revelation), 1922.
 Afrika, 1930.
 Ljudi Govore (The people speak), 1931.
 Dan šesti (The sixth day), 1961.

References

External links
Translated works by Rastko Petrović

1898 births
1949 deaths
Photographers from Belgrade
Serbian male poets
Yugoslav diplomats
Serbian surrealist writers
Serbian novelists
Serbian non-fiction writers
Writers from Belgrade
Burials at Belgrade New Cemetery
20th-century Serbian poets
20th-century Serbian novelists
20th-century non-fiction writers
Diplomats from Belgrade
Serbian military personnel of World War I
Male non-fiction writers